Robert A. Schadler is an American politician and businessman who served as a member of the West Virginia House of Delegates for the 49th district from 1988 to 1992 and again from 1998 to 2010. Schadler represented a district that includes Mineral County.

Education 
Schadler earned an associate degree from the Potomac State College of West Virginia University and a Bachelor of Arts degree from West Virginia University. He also received a license in mortuary science.

Career
Prior to entering politics, Schadler worked as a mortician and florist. During his tenure in the West Virginia House of Delegates, Schadler was the vice chair of the Health and Human Resources Committee.

As a member of the Mineral County Republican Executive Committee, Schadler, campaigned for Democrat candidates in violation of party rules. He was subsequently removed from his position for the violation. He then sued in Circuit Court to have the decision overturned and lost his case. Upon appeal the lower courts decision allowing his removal was upheld by a 5–0 decision of the Supreme Court of Appeals of West Virginia. In 2010, Schadler was mentioned as a possible candidate for Mineral County circuit clerk.

References

External links
 CapWiz Political
 WV Legislature

People from Mineral County, West Virginia
Living people
West Virginia Republicans
Year of birth missing (living people)
Potomac State College alumni
West Virginia University alumni